The 2019 Collegiate Rugby Championship was a college rugby sevens tournament played May 31 to June 2 at Talen Energy Stadium in Chester, Pennsylvania, a suburb of Philadelphia. It was the tenth annual Collegiate Rugby Championship, and the ninth consecutive year that the tournament was at Talen Energy Stadium (formerly known as PPL Park). The event was broadcast on ESPN+, ESPN2 and ESPNews. The men's competition consisted of 24 teams split into six pools. Lindenwood claimed their second consecutive title in only their third appearance in the tournament, defeating Life University in the men's final, 21–12.

Pool stage

Pool A

Pool B

Pool C

Pool D

Pool E

Pool F

Knockout stage

Bowl

Plate

Cup

Players

Most Valuable Player
Wesley White

Freedom Cup
With their 2019 Freedom Cup victory, Harvard qualified for the CRC Championship top division in 2020.

References 

2019
2019 rugby union tournaments for clubs
2019 in American rugby union
2019 rugby sevens competitions
2019 in sports in Pennsylvania
Collegiate Rugby
Collegiate Rugby